Parenthetical Girls was an experimental pop band formed in Everett, Washington in 2002, and disbanded in 2013.

History

Begun primarily as a recording project between Zac Pennington and Jeremy Cooper, the band, originally known as Swastika Girls, went through several line-up changes, all sharing a variety of instrumental duties, and was known for its revolving-door policy to membership, with Pennington the only constant. Other members, like Jherek Bischoff and former touring musician Sam Mickens (both of the band The Dead Science) continued to contribute to the group's recorded output, though neither toured with the band.

Following Cooper's departure, Pennington released (((GRRRLS))), the band's vinyl-only debut album on his own Slender Means Society label in 2004. Recorded with the help of Jherek Bischoff and Jamie Stewart (the latter of Xiu Xiu), (((GRRRLS))) featured different mixes of the seven songs on each side of the record.

This was followed by the digital-only self-release of their second Christmas-themed EP Christmas with Parenthetical Girls that same year, as well as their second album Safe as Houses (released by Slender Means Society in the United States and Acuarela Discos in Europe), the expanded CD reissue of the (((GRRRLS))) album, and a third self-released Christmas EP A Parenthetical Girls Family Christmas in 2006. A split 7-inch with the band The Dead Science was released by Obsolete Vernacular in 2007. 

After the release of Safe as Houses, the band's lineup was mostly solidified for the remainder of the 2000s as Pennington was joined by multi-instrumentalists Rachael Jenson and Matt Carlson, with percussionist Eddy Crichton joining soon after. Bischoff remained in his role as producer. This lineup would write and record Entanglements, an orchestra-influenced album, which was released in September 2008 as a split release via Tomlab and Slender Means Society.

Beginning in 2010, the band released a series of limited 12" EPs which would later be compiled into their 2013 album Privilege. The records were sold through Pennington's Slender Means Society label directly to fans, rather than distributed to record stores. At the end of the cycle, the fifth record came packaged with a box to house all the releases. The release was notable as each record was hand-numbered in the blood of the band number featured on the cover. The first 12", entitled Privilege, Pt. I: On Dead And Endearments, was released February 23, 2010 and was numbered in the blood of lead singer Zac Pennington. The second Privilege EP, subtitled The Past, Imperfect, was released on September 21, 2010. Privilege (Abridged), was released on February 14, 2013, containing 12 tracks taken from the five Privilege EPs. Through this period, the Entanglements lineup slowly fractured until only Pennington remained, backed on tour by Amber Smith and Paul Alcott for the final two releases until 2013, when the project became dormant.

Breakup

On June 19, 2017, Pennington announced his new project, Comedienne, which includes Deerhoof's Greg Saunier and longtime collaborator Jherek Bischoff. The announcement came alongside news that Parenthetical Girls is officially defunct.

As of 2019, Pennington is engaged in a project, entitled Popular Music, alongside Prudence Rees-Lee. They released their first album, a collection of covers from pop culture called Popular Music Plays in Darkness, on November 20, 2020.

Discography

Albums
 2004 (((GRRRLS)))
 2006 Safe as Houses
 2008 Entanglements
 2013 Privilege (Abridged)

Singles and EPs
 2004 Christmas with Parenthetical Girls EP
 2006 Twenty Bees 7"
 2006 A Parenthetical Girls Family Christmas EP
 2007 Parenthetical Girls/The Dead Science split 7-inch|Parenthetical Girls/Dead Science 7" split
 2007 Addendum (Safe as Houses European bonus EP)
 2008 A David Horvitz Picture Disc with Parenthetical Girls
 2008 A Song for Ellie Greenwich
 2009 The Scottish Play: Wherein the Group Parenthetical Girls Pay Well-intentioned (If Occasionally Misguided) Tribute to the Works of Ivor Cutler (Mini-Album)
 2009 Morrissey/The Smiths 7" split (with Xiu Xiu)
 2009 "The Christmas Creep"
 2010 Tomlab Alphabet Singles Series Z
 2010 Privilege, Pt. I: On Death & Endearments
 2010 Privilege, Pt. II: The Past, Imperfect
 2011 "Untanglements" (Entanglements Alternate Versions)
 2011 Covers. (Rare Cover Versions)
 2011 Privilege, Pt. III: Mend & Make Do
 2011 Careful Who You Dance With (Remixes EP)
 2011 Extra Life/Parenthetical Girls 12" split
 2011 "Demos for the Dreaming" (Kate Bush Covers)
 2011 Privilege, pt. IV: Sympathy For Spastics
 2011 Parenthetical Girls Save Christmas
 2012 Privilege, pt. V: Portrait of a Reputation
 2012 Good Christian Men Rejoice, It's Parenthetical Girls

Band members

Final members
 Zac Pennington – vocals, guitars, glockenspiel, keyboards, other instruments 
 Jherek Bischoff – percussion, drums, keyboards, production, arrangements 
 Amber W. Smith – keyboards, backing vocals 
 Paul Alcott – drums, keyboards, electronic percussion 

Former members
 Jeremy Cooper – multi-instrumentalist 
 E. Scott Yates – unknown instruments, arrangements 
 Sam Mickens – guitars, keyboards, percussion, electronics, backing vocals, arrangements 
 Rebecca Carlisle-Healy – backing vocals, keyboards, glockenspiel 
 Kitty Jenson – backing vocals 
 Rachael Jenson – keyboards, glockenspiel, violin, backing vocals, percussion 
 Matt Carlson - keyboards, guitars, backing vocals, arrangements, production 
 Brenna Murphy - percussion, keyboards 
 Eddy Crichton - drums, percussion, keyboards, guitars 
 Freddy Ruppert - keyboards, electronic percussion, electronics

References
 Bowers, William. (July 6, 2006) "Parenthetical Girls: Safe As Houses". Retrieved July. 22, 2007.
 Unterberger, Richie. (2006) [ "Allmusic Review - Safe As Houses."] Retrieved July. 22, 2007.

Specific

External links
 Official band site 
 Slender Means Society (record label)
 
 Official Myspace Page - downloadable and/or streaming MP3s, current tour dates.
 Acoustic Session with 'They Shoot Music - Don't They'

American experimental musical groups
Musical groups from Portland, Oregon
Musical groups established in 2003
People from Everett, Washington
2003 establishments in Washington (state)